Daviesia audax is a species of flowering plant in the family Fabaceae and is endemic to the south-west of Western Australia. It is an erect shrub with scattered, erect, thick, rigid, sharply pointed phyllodes, and orange flowers with reddish-brown markings.

Description

Taxonomy and naming
Daviesia audax was first formally described in 1995 by Michael Crisp in Australian Systematic Botany from specimens collected near Harrismith in 1979. The specific epithet (audax) means "bold", referring to sharply-pointed phyllodes.

Distribution and habitat
This species of pea grows in heathland with tall Grevillea species and is found in a narrow band between Harrismith and Lake King in the Avon Wheatbelt and Mallee biogeographic regions in the south-west of Western Australia.

Conservation status
Daviesia audax is classified as "not threatened" by the Government of Western Australia Department of Biodiversity, Conservation and Attractions.

References

audax
Eudicots of Western Australia
Plants described in 1995
Taxa named by Michael Crisp